Jonathon "Jon" McCormick (born 26 March 1981) is a former Australian rules footballer who played with Carlton in the Australian Football League (AFL). After being delisted by the Blues at the end of 2004, McCormick returned to his former team, Wangaratta, to play in the Ovens & Murray Football League. McCormick won the Morris Medal, awarded to the Ovens & Murray Football League's best and fairest player, in 2006 and also won back-to-back premierships with Wangaratta in 2007 and 2008, before suffering a knee injury in 2009 that forced him to take a five-year break from the game. On 26 July 2014 he resumed his career with Tarrawingee in the Ovens & King Football League.

Sources

Holmesby, Russell & Main, Jim (2009). The Encyclopedia of AFL Footballers. 8th ed. Melbourne: Bas Publishing.

Carlton Football Club players
Living people
1981 births
Murray Bushrangers players
Australian rules footballers from Victoria (Australia)
People from Wangaratta
Wangaratta Football Club players